Mauro Darío Jesús Cetto (born April 14, 1982 in Rosario) is a retired Argentine footballer who played as a defender. He lastly worked as the sporting director of Rosario Central.

Career
Cetto won the 2001 FIFA World Youth Championship with the Argentina Under-20 team. He moved to France in 2002, spending five seasons with FC Nantes before to become a mainstay at Toulouse FC, where he played from 2007 to 2011.

In June 2011 he accepted to join Serie A club Palermo on a free transfer. His Italian experience turned out to be unfortunate in his first season, as Matías Silvestre and Giulio Migliaccio (a central midfielder adapted as a centre back) were preferred to him as starting centre backs. On January 26, 2012 he was sent on loan to Lille until the end of the season, with an option for the team from Northern France to sign him permanently.

Cetto returned to Palermo after Lille opted not to acquire the player permanently, and was called up for the summer pre-season camp where he met new head coach Giuseppe Sannino, who then decided to keep him in the rosanero team for the 2012–13 season. As a result, he played the full 90 minutes (pairing with youngster Milan Milanović) in the first competitive game of the season, a 3–1 win against Cremonese.

On Thursday, January 24, 2013, San Lorenzo de Almagro from Argentina, a Primera A team, signed Mauro Cetto for 2 and a half years.

Honours
San Lorenzo
Argentine Primera División: 2013 Inicial
Copa Libertadores: 2014

References

External links
Statistics at Guardian StatsCentre

1982 births
Living people
Footballers from Rosario, Santa Fe
Argentine footballers
Argentina under-20 international footballers
Argentine expatriate footballers
Rosario Central footballers
FC Nantes players
Toulouse FC players
Palermo F.C. players
Lille OSC players
Copa Libertadores-winning players
San Lorenzo de Almagro footballers
Ligue 1 players
Serie A players
Argentine Primera División players
Expatriate footballers in France
Expatriate footballers in Italy
Argentine expatriate sportspeople in France
Argentine expatriate sportspeople in Italy
Association football defenders